The following is a list of the municipalities (comuni) of Sardinia, Italy.

There are 377 municipalities in Sardinia (as of January 2019):

17 in the Metropolitan City of Cagliari
74 in the Province of Nuoro
87 in the Province of Oristano
92 in the Province of Sassari
107 in the Province of South Sardinia

List

See also
List of municipalities of Italy

References

 
Geography of Sardinia
Sardinia
Communes